Song of the Birds is a 1985 collection of sayings, stories, and impressions of the Catalan cellist Pablo Casals. It is edited by British cellist Julian Lloyd Webber.
The title refers to El cant dels ocells, a traditional Catalan song which was frequently played by Casals.

1985 books
Essay collections